Laurel Run is a  long 2nd order tributary to Jacobs Creek in Westmoreland County, Pennsylvania.

Course
Laurel Run rises about 1 mile east of Kecksburg, Pennsylvania, and then flows southwest to join Jacobs Creek about 0.25 miles north-northeast of Laurelville.

Watershed
Laurel Run drains  of area, receives about 45.2 in/year of precipitation, has a wetness index of 406.12, and is about 77% forested.

References

 
Tributaries of the Ohio River
Rivers of Pennsylvania
Rivers of Westmoreland County, Pennsylvania
Allegheny Plateau